Sir William Asenhill alias Harpeden (died 1443), of Guilden Morden, Cambridgeshire and Walton, Wakefield, Yorkshire, was an English politician.

He was an Usher of the King's chamber by 1404 until 1413 and knighted before May 1416. He was a Member (MP) of the Parliament of England for Cambridgeshire in 1406, October 1416, 1422, 1423, 1425, 1426 and 1429 and was pricked High Sheriff of Cambridgeshire and Huntingdonshire for 1418–19.

Family
He married Joan, the daughter of Sir John Burgh (1328–1393) of Burrough Green, Cambridgeshire. They had one daughter.

References

Year of birth missing
1443 deaths
People from the City of Wakefield
People from South Cambridgeshire District
High Sheriffs of Cambridgeshire and Huntingdonshire
Knights Bachelor
English MPs 1406
English MPs October 1416
English MPs 1422
English MPs 1423
English MPs 1425
English MPs 1426
English MPs 1429